High School Musical 3: Senior Year is a 2008 American musical film written by Peter Barsocchini and directed by Kenny Ortega. The sequel to High School Musical 2 (2007) and the third installment of the High School Musical film series, the film follows Troy Bolton (Zac Efron), Gabriella Montez (Vanessa Hudgens), Sharpay Evans (Ashley Tisdale), her twin brother Ryan Evans (Lucas Grabeel), Chad Danforth (Corbin Bleu), and Taylor McKessie (Monique Coleman), who are in their final year of high school and face the daunting prospect of being separated as they go off to college. Joined by the rest of their East High classmates, they stage their last spring musical, reflecting their experiences, hopes, and fears about the future.

High School Musical 3: Senior Year was developed immediately following the success of its predecessor. Production returned to Utah for which Disney received a $2 million tax-break incentive, the largest the state has ever given to a film. Principal photography began in May 2008, and Walt Disney Pictures diverted a larger production and marketing budget to accommodate a theatrical release. The production returned to previous filming locations East High School and Murray High School, while additional scenes were filmed in Los Angeles. It is the first Disney Channel Original Movie to ever have a Disney Renaissance-level budget, be released in theaters, and air simultaneously under both the Walt Disney Pictures and Disney Channel labels (via Disney Branded Television).

High School Musical 3: Senior Year premiered in London on October 17, 2008, and was theatrically released in the United States on October 24, making it the only theatrical release in the franchise. Upon release, the film proved to be a critical success, with critics noting it as an improvement over the previous two installments due to the more emotional tone and themes, as well as the higher production values. The film was also a commercial success, as it grossed over $90 million worldwide in its first three days of release, setting a new record for the largest opening weekend for a musical film. Overall, the film grossed $252 million worldwide. The film's soundtrack was also successful, debuting and peaking at number two on the Billboard 200 in the United States. A spin-off film, Sharpay's Fabulous Adventure (2011), was released direct-to-video and on television.

Plot

East High's Wildcats basketball team compete against their long-time rival, the West High Knights, in the final game of the season. At the half, Troy rallies his teammates and wins the game. During the team's celebration, Troy and Gabriella discuss their unknown future and the short time they have left at East High.

The next day, at school, Ms. Darbus notices the lack of students signing up for the musical, and Sharpay suggests a one-woman show. Kelsi signs up everyone in homeroom, much to the class' dismay. Ms. Darbus announces that the show will be called "Senior Year", focusing on the future of the graduating seniors, and reveals that Sharpay, Ryan, Kelsi, and Troy have all been considered for a scholarship at Juilliard School, but only one will be chosen. Sharpay becomes desperate to win and, knowing that Kelsi will give the best songs to Troy and Gabriella, gets Ryan to try to persuade Kelsi to give them a song by predicting her and Ryan's future. Sharpay later befriends Tiara Gold, a British transfer student, and they begin working together.

While on the rooftop, Troy asks Gabriella to prom and she teaches him how to dance, while Taylor refuses Chad's attempt to ask her to the dance. She later relents when Chad asks again in front of the students during lunch. The group rehearses for the musical with a scene about their prom night. The next day, Ryan and Kelsi rehearse, which leads to Ryan asking Kelsi to prom, while Troy and Chad reminisce about their past in Reilly's Auto Parts. Tiara learns Gabriella has been accepted into the Stanford Freshman's Honors Program and informs Sharpay, who, in turn, informs Troy and convinces him that he is the only thing keeping Gabriella from going. Troy convinces Gabriella to go, and she leaves for college the next day.

Troy and his father, Jack, argue about which college he will attend, and Troy drives to East High conflicted until he finally screams at the top of his lungs in the theater. Witnessing this, Ms. Darbus reveals that she sent in his application for Juilliard. Troy gets a call from Gabriella saying that although she loves him, she will not return to Albuquerque for prom nor graduation. However, on the day of the dance, Troy visits Gabriella at Stanford University and they have their own dance. Meanwhile, Sharpay prepares for the musical at East High, and Troy texts his teammate Jimmie "Rocket Man" Zara to be his understudy because he is going to be late to the show.

Kelsi and Ryan start the show. As Troy and Gabriella's understudy, Jimmie performs with Sharpay and embarrasses her, although the audience applauds. Troy and Gabriella appear during the second half of the show and sing their duet together. Tiara betrays Sharpay, telling her she will take over the drama department next year. Sharpay finally learns how it feels to be manipulated and humiliated, but ultimately joins Tiara's performance and upstages her as payback.

At the end of the musical, Ms. Darbus reveals that both Kelsi and Ryan have won the Juilliard scholarship, and Troy reveals he has chosen to attend the University of California, Berkeley to be close to Gabriella, play basketball, and perform in theater. Taylor reveals that she will be attending Yale University with honors to study political science, and Sharpay and Chad reveal they will attend the University of Albuquerque for performing arts and basketball, respectively. At the graduation ceremony, Troy gives the class speech after being selected by Ms. Darbus, and everyone celebrates their graduation. The six leads walk toward the stage and take their final bows as the curtain closes.

Cast

 Zac Efron as Troy Bolton, the basketball team captain, the leader of the group and Gabriella's boyfriend.
 Vanessa Hudgens as Gabriella Montez, an intelligent honor student and Troy's girlfriend.
 Ashley Tisdale as Sharpay Evans, a glamorous ambitious teen, but conniving, diva, Ryan's twin sister, East High's Drama Club president and Zeke's love interest.
 Lucas Grabeel as Ryan Evans, an aspiring choreographer, Sharpay's twin brother and Kelsi's love interest.
 Corbin Bleu as Chad Danforth, one of Troy's teammates, a fellow basketball player and Taylor's love interest.
 Monique Coleman as Taylor McKessie, one of Gabriella's best friends, East High's class president/year book editor and Chad's love interest.
 Olesya Rulin as Kelsi Nielsen, one of Gabriella's best friends, a pianist, composer and Ryan's love interest.
 Chris Warren, Jr. as Zeke Baylor, one of Troy's teammates and Sharpay's love interest.
 Ryne Sanborn as Jason Cross, one of Troy's teammates and Martha's love interest.
 Kaycee Stroh as Martha Cox, one of Gabriella's best friends, a cheerleader, a dancer and Jason's love interest. 
 Bart Johnson as Jack Bolton, Troy's father, Lucille's husband and the coach of the East High Wildcats.
 Alyson Reed as Ms. Darbus, the stern drama teacher at East High.
 Jemma McKenzie-Brown as Tiara Gold, a freshman British exchange student who becomes Sharpay's assistant.
 Matt Prokop as Jimmie "Rocket Man" Zara, a freshman basketball player who idolizes Troy.
 Justin Martin as Donnie Dion, a freshman basketball player who idolizes Chad.
 Dave Fox as Coach Kellogg, another coach at East High.
 Leslie Wing Pomeroy as Lucille Bolton, Troy's mother and Jack's wife.
 Socorro Herrera as Lisa Montez, Gabriella's mother.
 Robert Curtis Brown as Vance Evans, Sharpay and Ryan's father.
 Jessica Tuck as Darby Evans, Sharpay and Ryan's mother.
 David Reivers (Corbin Bleu's father) as Charlie Danforth, Chad's father.
 Yolanda Wood as Jenny Danforth, Chad's mother.
 Joey Miyashima as Dave Matsui, a principal at East High.
 Jeremy Banks as Stagehand.
 Todd Snyder as Mr. Juilliard.
 Tara Starling as Ms. Juilliard.
 Manly "Little Pickles" Ortega as Boi Evans, Sharpay's pet dog.
 Stan Ellsworth as Mr. Riley

Musical numbers

Production
According to The Salt Lake Tribune, "...to help lure the production back to where it all began – at Salt Lake City's East High School – the GOED board Friday approved a maximum $2 million incentive for the production, the largest ever given to entice a filmmaker to Utah."

Principal photography began on May 3, 2008; the 41 days scheduled for shooting was a longer period than for the first two films.

Stan Carrizosa, the winner of ABC's summer reality show, High School Musical: Get in the Picture appears in "Just Getting Started", a song that is played over the end credits of the theatrical release of the film. The show's other 11 finalists were featured in the music video as well.

Development
Zac Efron was quoted in People Magazine as saying, "I can tell you that if the script is good and if we all agree on a final script, then there's nothing that is going to hold us back from doing it. We have fun making these movies and that's very rare in this business." Rumors persisted of ongoing salary disputes between Disney and the lead performers, particularly Efron. According to Rachel Abramowitz, as reported online by the Chicago Tribune, "an eclectic cross-section of Hollywood insiders think Efron should get a cool $5 million for High School Musical 3, the theatrical version of the franchise, which Disney hoped to make before the Writers Guild strike and Screen Actors Guild strike shut down Hollywood for several months. Efron declined to comment for the article, and although contract negotiations still are ongoing, sources say Efron is being offered a salary closer to $3 million, not $5 million, for the follow-up, which focuses on senior year at East High. Whatever the price, he's still perceived as a steal." The film was originally titled Haunted High School Musical with plans of a Halloween theme that were later scrapped.

Ortega stated that pre-production would most likely start in January 2008. Filming began May 3, 2008, at East High School in Salt Lake City, Utah. He stated that the script had been submitted before the writers' strike started and that they were developing music. He added that filming would take place in Salt Lake City as in the first two films, hinted that the plot will be something of the nature of the Wildcats' final year in high school and stated, "it looks like we've rounded up the cast."

Before filming began, the HSM3 board and cast held a press conference at East High School announcing the start of filming. The film was set for release in theaters in the United States on October 24, 2008, though the film was to open in several countries, including the United Kingdom, at least one week earlier. The film had an $11 million budget and a 40-day shooting period. The film was said at the time to be the final installment with the current cast.

Vanessa Hudgens photo controversy
Despite early reports that Vanessa Hudgens would be dropped from the film due to her nude photo scandal, The Walt Disney Company denied the reports, saying, "Vanessa has apologized for what was obviously a lapse in judgment. We hope she's learned a valuable lesson."

Release

Sing-along version
A sing-along edition with lyrics highlighted on the screen was released in select theaters on November 7, 2008, two weeks following its initial release.

Box office
High School Musical 3: Senior Year opened with $17 million on Friday, setting the biggest opening day for a musical film of all time, until the record was topped in 2012 by Les Miserables ($18.1 million). It debuted at the #1 spot (beating out Saw V) with an opening weekend of $42,030,184 in the United States and breaking the record, previously held by Enchanted, for the biggest opening ever for a movie musical. This record would later be broken by Pitch Perfect 2 in 2015 ($69.2 million). The film also opened at #1 overseas, with an international opening of $42,622,505. The film ultimately grossed $90,559,416 in North America and $162,349,761 in other territories leading to a worldwide total of $252,909,177.

Critical reception
High School Musical 3: Senior Year received mixed reviews from critics. On Rotten Tomatoes the film has a rating of 64%, based on 132 reviews, with an average rating of 5.95/10. The site's critical consensus reads, "It won't win many converts, but High School Musical 3 is bright, energetic, and well-crafted." The site also gave it a Golden Tomato for best musical film of 2008. Metacritic, which assigns a weighted average score, the film has a score of 57 out of 100, based on 26 critics, "mixed or average reviews".

The Telegraph praised the changes brought about by the higher budget of a theatrical release: "High School Musical 3 uses its bigger budget to inject colour, scale, and visual depth. The opening basketball game alone is dizzying as the camera swoops high and wide before a winning point makes the crowd erupt".

Stephen Farber, writing for Reuters, says the film "will please fan base but won't win converts", as the story "never really does kick in" and that "the picture quickly grows tedious", while MSNBC's Alonso Duralde describes it as "a stitched-together Frankenstein monster of an entertainment, featuring major components that were already trotted out the first two times."

Peter Johnson of The Guardian describes the film as so bland that it "makes cellophane taste like chicken jalfrezi", and says that "the sheer squeaky-cleanness of everything is creepy, and when the characters are called upon to dance, they do so with robotic efficiency, and sing in that decaffeinated high vibrato, like 21st-century Hollywood castrati."

Entertainment Weekly was very positive towards the film, praising the stars' energy: "the beauty of Efron's performance is that he's a vibrant athletic hoofer who leaps and clowns with the heartthrob vigor of a young Erika Casanova, yet he's also achingly sincere. His fast-break alertness makes him the most empathetic of teen idols; he's like a David Cassidy who knows how to act, and who can swoon without getting too moist about it. Apart from Efron, the breakout star is Ashley Tisdale, whose Sharpay makes narcissism a goofy, bedazzled pleasure."

MovieGuide has also favorably reviewed the film, strongly recommending it for the family as "fun, clean and full of energy" and describing it as "thin on plot" yet nevertheless "a phenomenon."

BBC film critic Mark Kermode loved the film and said it was in his top 5 films for the year, and named Tisdale the "Best Supporting Actress" of 2008.

The Fort Worth Star-Telegram stated that the latest installment was "critic-proof" and "everything fans could hope for and more." They go on to say that "the kids finally look like true performers rather than Disney Channel mainstays desperately trying to remain relevant, and they deserve the lucrative careers that lie ahead" and gave the film a rating of four out of five stars. Hudgens was recognized as Kids' Choice Children's Pick at Nickelodeon's Kids' Choice Awards, Efron was voted Best Male Performance at the 2009 MTV Movie Awards and Choice Actor: Music/Dance at the 2009 Teen Choice Awards, and Tisdale was voted Breakthrough Performance Female at the 2009 MTV Movie Awards and Best Supporting Actress at the 2009 UK Kermode Awards.

Accolades

Home media
High School Musical 3: Senior Year was released in Region 1 DVD and Blu-ray on February 17, 2009, in Region 2 DVD on February 16, 2009 and in Region 3 DVD on February 24, 2009. The DVD was released in single- and two-disc editions.

In Region 2, the single-disc edition DVD featured most of the two-disc edition bonus features such as bloopers, deleted scenes, extended version of the film, sing-along and cast goodbyes. In Region 3, only the single-disc edition DVD was released with all of the two-disc bonus features as well the extended edition of the film. In the Philippines, it was released on February 25, 2009. The Region 4 DVD was released on April 8, 2009. As of November 1, 2009, the DVD has sold over 23 million copies and generated over $200 million in sales revenue.

Broadcasting
The film premiered on Disney Channel in the United States on April 4, 2010, before the series premiere of Good Luck Charlie. The premiere on Disney Channel brought 4 million viewers.

International release
The film premiered on Disney Channel India on 18 October 2009 and on 5 December 2009 in Disney Channel Asia. On 4 December 2009, for one night only, it premiered on Disney Cinemagic, and it premiered on Disney Channel in the United Kingdom and Ireland in January/February 2010. It premiered on 12 December 2009 on Disney Channel New Zealand/Australia. And 16 March 2011 in Latin America. It premiered in France on 31 October 2011 on M6.

Future
A spin-off film, Sharpay's Fabulous Adventure (2011), was released direct-to-video and on television. Set one year after the events of Senior Year, it follows Sharpay Evans' life after graduation as she sets out to earn a place in a Broadway show. 

In early 2016, Disney announced that a fourth installment of the series was "in the works", later announcing a casting call for the film, tentatively referred to as High School Musical 4. In March 2016, details about the film's prospective principal characters were reported.

A series titled High School Musical: The Musical: The Series was announced in 2017, with its first episode premiering on ABC, Disney Channel, and Freeform on November 8, 2019, serving as a simulcast preview before its release on Disney+ on November 12. The series takes place in a fictionalized version of the real-life East High School with a brand new cast of characters, as they stage an adaptation of the first High School Musical film.

References

External links

 
 
 
 
 
 
 DVD Review, DVD Talk
 Song lyrics, Allmusicals

High School Musical films
2008 films
2000s musical comedy films
2008 romantic comedy films
American musical comedy films
American romantic comedy films
American romantic musical films
2000s high school films
American teen comedy films
American teen romance films
2000s English-language films
Films directed by Kenny Ortega
Films set in New Mexico
American sequel films
Walt Disney Pictures films
Films shot in Salt Lake City
American teen musical films
American high school films
American children's comedy films
American children's musical films
2000s American films